Rawli is a place situated in Shajapur District of Madhya Pradesh, India. As per the 2011 census of India, the village has of 317 with 177 males and 140 females.

References

External links 
 villagemap.net

 Madhya Pradesh